Steidl is a German-language publisher, an international publisher of photobooks, and a printing company, based in Göttingen, Germany. It was started in 1968 by Gerhard Steidl and is still run by him.

Overview

The company was started by Gerhard Steidl. The company's first book was Befragung der Documenta (1972).

From 1974, [Gerhard] Steidl added political non-fiction to his program. In the early 1980s, he expanded into literature and selected art and photography books, and in 1989, he published his first paperback editions. [...] In 1996, Steidl finally decided to follow his passion for photography and to start his own internationally oriented photo book program.

Gerhard Steidl still heads the company and is in charge of the production of every book. He endeavours to follow the preferences of the particular photographer for layout, paper, and binding, and insists on working with paper, because of the importance of the feel of the book and the difference between backlighting and reflected light. Printing, binding and all other work is done within a four-storey house on Düstere Strasse in Göttingen.

From 1996, Steidl also specialized in photography. He published the works of photographers such as Robert Frank, Joel Sternfeld, Richard Serra, Bruce Davidson, Arnold Odermatt, Edward Ruscha, Susan Meiselas, Karl Lagerfeld, Saul Leiter, Lou Reed, Martin Schoeller, Juergen Teller and many others. Advertising materials—including catalogues, flyers and invitations to haute couture shows—are produced for Chanel. Steidl and Lagerfeld worked together from the early 1990s until his death in 2019. In 2006, Lagerfeld said that Gerhard Steidl was the "best printer in the world".

The number of titles produced by Steidl is unusually large for an art publisher: about three hundred a year.

Gerhard Steidl produces special editions, but prefers what he calls "'democratic books' or more 'prêt à porter' books", books that can freely be reprinted if the demand for them is sufficient. Since 1993 up to his death, Steidl has held the worldwide rights to the work of Nobel Prize Laureate Günter Grass.

From 2009 to 2010, the Musée de l'Élysée (Lausanne) held an exhibition, The Fine Art and Craft of the Steidl Book, Lasting Impressions.

Steidl was the topic of a 2010 documentary, How to Make a Book with Steidl.

In 2020, Gerhard Steidl received the Gutenberg Prize of the International Gutenberg Society and the City of Mainz. In 2021, Gerhard Steidl received the Award for Photographic Publishing of the  Royal Photographic Society.

References

External links

"Gerhard Steidl: Fine art of Steidl book + Last Impressions" by Marie-Claire Mermoud at egodesign.ca.

1968 establishments in West Germany
1972 establishments in West Germany
Book publishing companies of Germany
Mass media in Göttingen
Publishing companies established in 1972
Visual arts publishing companies